Chayanika Chowdhury (born 1 December) is a Bangladeshi television drama director. She has been directing television dramas since 2001, and as of September 2017, she has directed 347 dramas.

Education
Chowdhury graduated from Chhayanaut Sangeet Biddayatan for Rabindra Sangeet and then went to Santiniketan.

Career
Chowdhury debuted directing television dramas in 2001 with the drama Shesh Belay. She got her breakthrough through the drama titled Ek Jiboney aired on 28 October 2002.

Chowdhury's 50th directorial work was Maya, the 100th was Choloman Chhobi in 2010, the 200th was Juari in 2013 and the 300th was Sona'r Manush in 2016.

Chowdhury published her first book Mayaghar in 2014.

In 2019 Chayanika Chowdhury started directing a film Bishwoshundori starring Siam Ahmed and Pori Moni.

Personal life
Chowdhury is married to Arun Chowdhury, a writer and journalist since 1990. They have a daughter Anulekha. Her sister Tamalika Karmakar is a film and television actress.

Awards
 Cultural Reporters Award as the Best Director (2003)
 Best Critic Award as the Best Director from Cultural Journalist Forum of Bangladesh (2004)
 Special Award from Charunirom Institute of Acting and Research (2010)

Works

Television

Films

References

External links

Living people
Bangladeshi television directors
Bengali Hindus
Bangladeshi Hindus
Year of birth missing (living people)
Place of birth missing (living people)